mpv is  free and open-source media player software based on MPlayer, mplayer2 and FFmpeg. It runs on several operating systems, including Unix-like operating systems (Linux, BSD-based, macOS) and Microsoft Windows, along with having an Android port called mpv-android. It is cross-platform, running on ARM, PowerPC, x86/IA-32, x86-64, and MIPS architecture.

History
mpv was forked by Vincent Lang, also known as wm4, in 2012 from mplayer2, which was forked in 2010 from MPlayer. The motive for the fork was to encourage developer activity by removing unmaintainable code and dropping support for very old systems. As a result, the project had a large influx of contributions.

Since June 2015, the project's source code is in the process of being relicensed from GNU General Public License version 2 (GPLv2) or later to GNU Lesser General Public License version 2.1 (LGPLv2.1) or later to allow using mpv as a library in more applications.

Changes from MPlayer
mpv has had several notable changes since it was forked from MPlayer; the most user-visible being the addition of an on-screen-controller (OSC) minimal GUI integrated with mpv to offer basic mouse-controllability. This was intended to make interaction easier for new users and to enable precise and direct seeking.

Video websites By using youtube-dl, mpv natively supports playback of high-definition video (HD) content and audio on YouTube and over 1000 other supported sites. This allows mpv to replace site-specific video players based on Adobe Flash or HTML5.

High quality video output mpv includes a customizable video output driver based on OpenGL as well as the Vulkan API, which supports over 100 options for controlling playback quality, including the use of advanced upscaling filters, color management, and customizable pixel shaders.

Audio scaling algorithmThe player is equipped with a scaletempo2 parameter for speed changing at constant pitch, for which it uses the Waveform Similarity Overlap-and-add (WSOLA) algorithm, citing more smoothness than the original scaletempo used in the original mplayer, and rubberband.

Improved client API Beyond working as a stand-alone media player, mpv is designed to be used directly by other applications through a library interface called libmpv. This required making all mpv code thread safe. An example of an application which uses libmpv is Plex. This form of player control, along with a JSON IPC mechanism, replaces MPlayer's "slave mode".

Encoding subsystem mpv includes a new video encoding mode that can be used to save files being played under different formats. This allows mpv to work as a transcoder, supporting many video formats. This feature serves as a direct replacement for the MEncoder component of MPlayer, which was a separate program rather than being built into the player.

Lua scripting mpv's behavior and functions are customizable via use of small programs written in the Lua scripting language, which can be used for tasks like cropping video, providing a graphical user interface (GUI) or automatically adjusting the display's refresh rate.

Removed functions
 all support for VCD discs

Interface and graphical front-ends
Like the original MPlayer, mpv is still primarily a command-line application although it has a more advanced user interface than MPlayer that can use not only the keyboard but also the mouse for mpv’s on screen controller (OSC). However, this OSC is still not a full-featured GUI, and there are a number of front-ends available, which use GUI widgets for Qt, GTK, or some other widget toolkit to give mpv a more complete graphical interface.

The following are all open source front-ends of mpv (based on "libmpv" or the command-line version of mpv) which try to provide more features and more user-friendly interface than mpv, and/or better integration with various operating systems or desktop environments.

 Baka MPlayer - media player on Windows, Linux, and macOS although macOS version requires the user to compile from source, with Qt5 widgets, written in C++. Its main goal is uncluttered, simple design. Its development stalled in January 2017 in favor of another mpv frontend by the same developers, Mochi Player, which is not quite finished yet.

 Deepin Movie - for Linux - Written by and default video player for the Chinese Deepin distro and desktop environment.

 Celluloid (formerly GNOME MPV) - for Linux - based on GTK Its goal is to be a simple GTK-based graphical interface for mpv that meets the GNOME Human Interface Guidelines.

 IINA - macOS 10.10+ media player with native macOS Cocoa interface It is a full-featured native macOS graphical interface for mpv that makes use of new features in the most recent versions of macOS. mpv config file and script system are also integrated.

 Kawaii-Player - Linux and Windows 10 - media player and media server with Qt5 widgets. Its goal is to not just be a multimedia player but also an audio/video library manager and portable media server and torrent streaming server/player. 

 Media Player Classic Qute Theater (mpc-qt) - Linux and Windows media player with Qt5 widgets, written in C++. Its goal is to reproduce and ultimately improve upon the functionality of Media Player Classic Home Cinema (mpc-hc), a Windows-only program, as a cross-platform mpv-based multimedia player that also works on Unix-like operating systems like Linux.

 mpv.net - Windows media player with native Windows interface. Its goal is to provide the standard mpv OSC interface on Windows along with a customizable Windows context menu, C# scripting, and a Managed Extensibility Framework (MEF) for addons. 

 OvoPlayer - Linux and Windows music player that supports many backends, based on LCL widgetsets, written in Pascal. Its goal is to be a flexible audio player that supports as many audio engine backends like mpv as possible. 

 SMPlayer - full-featured, cross-platform and skinable with advanced features and YouTube and Chromecast support that can use MPlayer or mpv. Available for Microsoft Windows, Linux and macOS, and written in C++ with Qt4/Qt5. 

 Sugoi Player - media player on Windows (that might work on Linux and macOS but those are untested) forked from Baka MPlayer, with Qt5 widgets, written in C++. It aims to improve upon and continue development of an mpv frontend based on Baka MPlayer, since Baka MPlayer’s development stalled in January 2017. 

 xt7-player-mpv - Linux media player with Qt5 or Qt4 widgets, written in Gambas 3 (a dialect of BASIC). Its goal is usability, and a variety of extra features like YouTube and SHOUTcast integration, media tagging, library and playlist management, as well as adding more features beyond that.

See also

 FFmpeg - recommended decoding library for mpv
 Libav - alternative decoding library for mpv
 libavcodec – API which mpv uses for decoding
 Comparison of video player software

References

External links

 
 

Cross-platform free software
Free media players
Free video software
Linux media players
Lua (programming language)-scriptable software
Software that uses FFmpeg